Versinikia Peak is the sharp peak in Ellsworth Mountains, Antarctica rising to 2900 m on the side ridge that trends 8.8 km from the south rib of Mount Giovinetto on the main crest of north-central Sentinel Range northeastwards via Evans Peak to Debren Pass.  It has partly ice-free west and southeast slopes, and surmounts Patton Glacier to the southeast and the head of Rumyana Glacier to the northwest.

The peak is named after the medieval fortress of Versinikia in Southeastern Bulgaria.

Location
US mapping in 1961 and 1988.

Maps
 Vinson Massif.  Scale 1:250 000 topographic map.  Reston, Virginia: US Geological Survey, 1988.
 Antarctic Digital Database (ADD). Scale 1:250000 topographic map of Antarctica. Scientific Committee on Antarctic Research (SCAR). Since 1993, regularly updated.

References
 Versinikia Peak. SCAR Composite Gazetteer of Antarctica.
 Bulgarian Antarctic Gazetteer. Antarctic Place-names Commission. (details in Bulgarian, basic data in English)

External links
 Versinikia Peak. Copernix satellite image

Ellsworth Mountains
Bulgaria and the Antarctic
Mountains of Ellsworth Land